Scopula alfierii is a moth of the family Geometridae. It is found in Egypt and Oman.

Subspecies
Scopula alfierii alfierii (Egypt)
Scopula alfierii montana (Wiltshire, 1980) (Oman)

References

Moths described in 1949
alfierii
Moths of Africa
Moths of Asia